The Ministry of Health (MOH) is the government ministry responsible for the governance and guidance of the health, healthcare and health industry of Vietnam. In conjunction with other ministries and the prime minister's office, the Ministry is responsible for creating and promulgating long-term health policy programs such as the "National Strategy on Nutrition for the 2001 - 2010 period" and the "National Policy on Injury Prevention 2002 - 2010".  Its main offices are located in Ba Đình District, Hanoi. In November 2019, Minister Nguyễn Thị Kim Tiến was dismissed from the position because she reached retirement age and Deputy Prime Minister Vũ Đức Đam took charge of the ministry. On 7 July 2020, amidst the COVID-19 pandemic, Nguyễn Thanh Long, who is a professor specialized in infectious diseases, was temporarily appointed for the position, acting as the Minister of Health. On 12 November 2020, he officially became the Minister of Health. He held the post until June 7th 2022, when he was relieved of duty by the National Assembly following corruption allegations regarding the Viet A COVID-19 test kit scandal.

Ministerial units
 Department of Communications and Reward
 Department of Maternal Health and Children
 Department of Medical Equipment and Works 
 Department of Health Insurance
 Department of Planning and Finance
 Department of Organisation and Personnel
 Department of International Cooperation
 Department of Legislation
 Office of the Ministry
 Health Strategy and Policy Institute
 Ministry Inspectorate
 General Department of Preventive Medicine
 Agency of HIV/AIDS Prevention
 Agency of Food Safety
 Agency of Health Environment
 Agency of Science, Technology and Training
 Agency of Medical Services Administration
 Agency of Traditional Medicine Administration
 Agency of Drug Administration
 Agency of Information Technology
 Directorate of Population and Family Planning

Administrative units
 Health Strategy and Policy Institute
 Health and Lifestyle Newspaper
 Journal of Medicine and Pharmacy

See also
 Health in Vietnam
 Government of Vietnam
 Public health
 Topic outline of health
 Topic outline of health science
 World Health Organization

References

External links
 Ministry of Health official site

Health
Medical and health organizations based in Vietnam
Vietnam
Governmental office in Hanoi